Betty Mahmoody (née Lover; born June 9, 1945, in Alma, Michigan) is an American author and public speaker best known for her book, Not Without My Daughter, which was subsequently made into a film of the same name. She is the President and co-founder of One World: For Children, an organization that promotes understanding between cultures and strives to offer security and protection to children of bi-cultural marriages.

Not Without My Daughter
Not Without My Daughter is an account of her experiences in 1984–1986 when she left Alpena, Michigan to go to Iran with her husband and daughter for what she was promised would be a short visit. Once there, she and her daughter were held against their will. The book was made into a 1991 film starring Sally Field as Betty.

According to the book, she and her husband, Sayyed Bozorg Mahmoody, and her daughter, Mahtob Mahmoody, traveled to Iran in August 1984 for what her husband said would be a two-week visit with his family in Tehran. Once the two weeks were over, however, he refused to allow his wife and child to leave. When she protested, Moody struck Betty. It was the first time Mahtob had seen her father hit her mother. After Moody broke the news to Betty, she got extremely sick with dysentery. Mahtob sat at her side day after day, watching her fade in and out of consciousness. Betty asked Mahtob to make sure Moody, a medical doctor, didn’t give her an injection as she feared it may have been lethal. Mahtob sat there like a loyal soldier and made sure her mother was safe. Betty was trapped in a nation hostile to Americans, in-laws who were hostile to her, and an abusive husband. According to the book, her husband separated her from her daughter for weeks on end. He also assaulted her, and threatened to kill her if she tried to leave.

She eventually escaped with her daughter. The book details her  escape over the snowy Zagros Mountains into Turkey, and the help she received from many Iranians. After returning to the USA in 1986, she filed for divorce.

Other books
Mahmoody compiled stories of other parents whose foreign spouses estranged them from their children in the book For the Love of a Child (1992).

Sayyed Bozorg Mahmoody

Alexis Kouros collaborated with Mahmoody's ex-husband to create a documentary, Without My Daughter, to counter the claims in Betty's book.

On August 23, 2009, Sayyed Bozorg Mahmoody died in Tehran, Iran, aged 70. The state news agency IRNA quoted his nephew, Majid Ghodsi, as reporting that he died in a hospital from kidney problems and other complications.

Personal life
Mahmoody is a devout member of the Wisconsin Evangelical Lutheran Synod like her daughter Mahtob. In 1992 she was inducted into Omicron Delta Kappa, the National Leadership Honor Society, by Ferris State University as an honoris causa initiate.

She has two sons from a previous marriage named Joseph and John, who are 13 and nine years older than Mahtob respectively.

See also
 Phyllis Chesler, who was married to a Westernized Muslim man from Afghanistan
 Aurora Nilsson, who was married to a Westernized Muslim man from Afghanistan
 Debbie Rodriguez, co-founder of The Kabul Beauty School

References

1945 births
Living people
Activists from Michigan
American women writers
Writers from Michigan
People from Alma, Michigan
American Lutherans
21st-century American women